Central Alabama Institute was a school for African Americans in Alabama. It was established as Rust Normal Institute, a school to train African American teachers in Alabama in 1872. It opened in Huntsville, Alabama in 1878. It became Central Alabama Academy in 1890. In 1904 it moved to Mason City on the outskirts of Birmingham, Alabama. In 1922 its main building and other structures were struck by fire. It was not rebuilt or reopened. The school was affiliated with the Methodist Church.

H. H. Sutton was one of its principals. Alexander P. Camphor was president from 1908 until 1916. In 1916, J. B. F. Shaw was president. R. N. Brooks also served as principal of the school.

Jay Samuel Stowell wrote about the school.

Margaret Walker née Alexander was born on the campus where her father Rev. Sigismund Walker taught.

Alumni
Anna E. Cooper

References

1872 establishments in Alabama
1922 disestablishments in Alabama
Educational institutions established in 1872
Educational institutions disestablished in 1922
Buildings and structures in Huntsville, Alabama
Education in Huntsville, Alabama
Schools in Birmingham, Alabama
African-American history in Birmingham, Alabama